This is a list of notable people affiliated with the International Baccalaureate, including IB directors-general, chairs of the IB Board of Governors (previously known as the IB Council of Foundation), and notable graduates of one or more of the three IB programmes.

IB directors-general
 Alec Peterson (1968–1977)
 Gerard Renaud (1977–1983)
 Roger Peel (1983–1998)
 Derek Blackman (1998–1999)
 George Walker (1999–2005)
 Jeffrey Beard (2006-2013)
 Dr Siva Kumari (2014–2021)
Olli-Pekka Heinonen (2021-present)

Chair of IB Board of Governors
 John Goormaghtigh (1968–1981)
 Seydou Madani Sy (1981–1984)
 Piet Gathier (1984–1990)
 Thomas Hagoort (1990–1996)
 Bengt Thelin (1996–1997)
 Greg Crafter (1997–2003)
 Monique Seefried (2003–2009)
 Carol Bellamy (2009 - April 2015)
 George Rupp (April 2015 – present)

Notable alumni
 Randa Abdel-Fattah, author, graduate of the Australian International Academy.
 Douglas Alexander, British Labour party Politician and former Shadow Secretary of State for Foreign Affairs, graduate of the Pearson College UWC in Canada
 Maudy Ayunda, Indonesian singer, graduate of British School Jakarta
 Alia Bhatt, Bollywood actress, daughter of Mahesh Bhatt, graduate of Jamnabai Narsee School
 Marina Catena, Director of the United Nations World Food Program, graduate of UWC Adriatic
 Felipe Contepomi, Former Argentine rugby player and Orthopaedic Surgeon, graduate of Colegio Cardenal Newman
 Marina Diamandis, Welsh musician and pop artist, who took the diploma at St. Catherine's British School in Greece
 Anne Enright, 2007 Man Booker Prize award-winning novelist, first Irish Laureate for Fiction and graduate of Pearson College UWC 
 Mahan Esfahani, noted harpsichordist, graduate of Richard Montgomery High School
 Julia Galef, American philosopher, graduate of Richard Montgomery High School 
 Gael García Bernal, actor, graduate of the Edron Academy
 Sunit Ghosh graduate of Global Indian International School
 Alex Honnold, American professional rock climber, graduate of Mira Loma High School
 Akihiko Hoshide, astronaut, graduate of the United World College of South East Asia
 Princess Raiyah bint Hussein, daughter of King Hussein and Queen Noor of Jordan, graduate of the United World College of the Atlantic
 Khairy Jamaluddin, Malaysian politician, Malaysian federal Minister of Science, Technology and Innovation, graduate of the United World College of South East Asia
 Lauren Jauregui, Cuban-American singer-songwriter, dancer, and former member of Fifth Harmony, graduate of Carrollton School of the Sacred Heart
 Ken Jennings, American quiz show contestant and Jeopardy! winnings record holder, graduate of the Seoul Foreign School
 Sonam Kapoor, Bollywood actress, daughter of Anil Kapoor, graduate of the United World College of South East Asia
 Robbie Kay, actor (Pirates of the Caribbean: On Stranger Tides, Once Upon a Time), graduate of the British School of Houston
 Kesha, American singer graduated from Brentwood High School (Tennessee)
Kim Jong-un: Supreme Leader of North Korea, attended the International School of Berne, although it is unclear if he graduated
Praya Lundberg, Thai/Swedish actress and model, Southeast Asia's first UNHCR Goodwill Ambassador, graduate of NIST International School
 Nadiem Makarim, Minister of Education, Culture, Research and Technology, in Indonesia and Founder of Gojek, Indonesia's first startup valued over US$10 billion, graduate of United World College of South East Asia
 Mata (rapper), Polish hip-hop singer-songwriter
 George Miller (Joji),  singer-songwriter, record producer, author, and former Internet personality, graduate of Canadian Academy in Japan
 Karen Mok, Hong Kong-based actress and singer-songwriter, attended UWC Adriatic
 Dustin Moskovitz, co-founder of Facebook, graduate of Vanguard High School
Derek Muller, creator of Veritasium YouTube channel, graduate of West Vancouver Secondary School
 Carey Mulligan, actor, International School of Düsseldorf
 Mohamed Nasheed, politician, former president of the Maldives, attended Overseas Children's School (now Overseas School of Colombo), Sri Lanka
 Lupita Nyong'o, Kenyan actress, (12 Years a Slave, Academy Award for best supporting actress 2014), graduate of St. Mary's School, Nairobi 
 Olajide Olatunji (KSI), singer-songwriter, YouTube personality
 Jorma Ollila, former CEO of Nokia, graduate of the United World College of the Atlantic
 Ignacio Padilla, Mexican novelist and short story writer, graduate of Waterford Kamhlaba United World College of Southern Africa
Kaesang Pangarep, son of Indonesian President Joko Widodo, graduate of ACS International
 Julie Payette, Governor General of Canada, astronaut, graduate of the United World College of the Atlantic
 Nico Rosberg, former Formula 1 driver for Mercedes-AMG Petronas, 2016 FIA Formula 1 Drivers' Championship winner. Graduate of International School of Nice
 Peter Sands, former CEO of Standard Chartered Bank, graduate of Pearson College UWC
Hege Solbakken, CEO of Offshore Media Group, graduate of Bergen Katedralskole
Sarah Tan, Channel V VJ, graduate of the United World College of South East Asia
Ebba Busch Thor, Leader of the Christian Democrats (Sweden)
Justin Trudeau, Prime Minister of Canada, Leader of the Liberal Party of Canada, IB Diploma from the Collège Jean-de-Brébeuf in 1991.
Michael Tubbs, Mayor of Stockton, California, IB Diploma from Franklin High School (Stockton) 
 Willem-Alexander, Prince of Orange, King of the Netherlands, graduate of United World College of the Atlantic
Abiodun Williams, President of The Hague Institute for Global Justice, graduate of Pearson College UWC

References

International Baccalaureate